Jimmy Nilsen (born 16 November 1966) is a former international motorcycle speedway rider from Sweden.

Career
Jimmy Nilsen was Swedish Champion in 1996 after finishing 3rd in 1994. Nilsen also rode in five World Finals as well as representing Sweden in Test Matches, World Pairs (best finish 2nd in 1989 with Per Jonsson) and World Team Cup (finishing 2nd in 1991, 1992 and 1998). He also helped Sweden to 3rd place in the 2001 World Cup Final in Wrocław, Poland.

After finishing second to Per Jonsson at the 1985 European (World) Under-21 Championship Final in Abensberg, West Germany, Nilsen impressed when as a 19-year he finished what would be a career best 4th in the 1986 World Final (his first World Final appearance) at the Silesian Stadium in Katowice, Poland, a placing he would repeat in the 2 day 1987 World Final at the Amsterdam Olympic Stadium in the Netherlands. He would appear in another three World Finals, finishing 5th in 1990 in Bradford, England (won by Jonsson), 5th in 1991 at Ullevi in Göteborg, and 7th in 1992 at the Olympic Stadium in Wrocław, Poland.

Nilsen later qualified for the Speedway Grand Prix in 1997, 1998, 1999, 2000 and 2001, finishing a career best 2nd in 1998 behind countryman Tony Rickardsson.

In 1990 after appearing in a "Rest of the World" team in a test against Australia at the North Arm Speedway in Adelaide, South Australia, Nilsen won the inaugural running of the Jack Young Memorial Cup named in honour of the Adelaide rider who had won the World Final in 1951 and 1952. A year later he returned to Australia as part of the touring Swedish team that defeated Australia 3-2 in a 5 match test series.

World Final Appearances

Individual World Championship
 1986 -  Chorzów, Silesian Stadium - 4th - 11pts
 1987 -  Amsterdam, Olympic Stadium - 4th - 22pts
 1990 -  Bradford, Odsal Stadium - 5th - 10pts
 1991 -  Göteborg, Ullevi - 5th - 10pts
 1992 -  Wrocław, Olympic Stadium - 7th - 7pts

World Pairs Championship
 1988 -  Bradford, Odsal Stadium (with Per Jonsson) - 5th - 29pts (17)
 1989 -  Leszno, Alfred Smoczyk Stadium (with Per Jonsson) - 2nd - 44pts (23)
 1990 -  Landshut, Ellermühle Stadium (with Per Jonsson) - 4th - 33pts (17)
 1991 -  Poznań, Olimpia Poznań Stadium (with Henrik Gustafsson / Per Jonsson) - 2nd - 24pts (8)

World Team Cup
 1985 –  Long Beach, Veterans Memorial Stadium (with Jan Andersson / Per Jonsson / Tommy Nilsson / Pierre Brannefors) – 4th – 10pts (2)
 1986 -  Göteborg, Ullevi,  Vojens, Speedway Center and  Bradford, Odsal Stadium (with Jan Andersson / Per Jonsson / Tommy Nilsson / Erik Stenlund / Tony Olsson) - 4th - 73pts (16)
 1988 -  Long Beach Veterans Memorial Stadium (with Conny Ivarsson / Henrik Gustafsson / Tony Olsson / Per Jonsson) - 3rd - 22pts (5)
 1989 -  Bradford, Odsal Stadium (with Mikael Blixt / Per Jonsson / Tony Olsson / Erik Stenlund) - 3rd - 30pts (0)
 1991 -  Vojens, Speedway Center - 2nd - 30pts (7)
 1992 -  Kumla, Kumla Speedway - 2nd - 33pts (1)
 1997 -  Piła, Stadion Żużlowy Centrum - 3rd - 21pts (3)
 1998 -  Vojens, Speedway Center - 2nd - 24pts (13)

World Cup
 2001 -  Wrocław, Olympic Stadium - 3rd - 51pts (7)

Individual Under-21 World Championship
 1985 -  Abensberg, Motorstadion - 2nd - 13pts

Speedway Grand Prix results

References 

1966 births
Living people
Swedish speedway riders
Bradford Dukes riders
Swindon Robins riders
Berwick Bandits riders
Oxford Cheetahs riders
Belle Vue Aces riders